Leucargyra puralis is a moth in the family Crambidae. It was described by George Hampson in 1896. It is found in Brazil.

The wingspan is about 60 mm. The forewings are silvery white.

The larvae have been recorded feeding inside grasses.

References

Moths described in 1896
Schoenobiinae
Fauna of Brazil
Moths of South America